Wightia is a genus of flowering plants tentatively sister to the Phrymaceae which currently contains only two species. It is found in South Asia and South East Asia, from Nepal and India to Thailand, Vietnam and China's Yunnan Province, at altitudes below . There are still morphological characters as well as nuclear genome data to support Wightia as sister to Paulownia leading it to be of proposed hybrid origin from Phrymaceae and Paulowniaceae. Due to chloroplast and mitochondrial data showing Wightia as sister to Phrymaceae it is proposed that a new family Wightiaceae be recognized.

References

Lamiales genera
Flora of India (region)
Flora of Nepal
Flora of Thailand
Flora of Vietnam
Flora of Yunnan
Paulowniaceae
Taxa described in 1830
Taxa named by Nathaniel Wallich